Sabine Götschy (married name Kleinhenz, born 8 June 1962) is a German-born French former canoeist who won at senior level the Wildwater Canoeing World Championships.

Biography
She competed in the early to mid-1990s. She won a bronze medal in the K-2 5000 m event at the 1991 ICF Canoe Sprint World Championships in Paris. Götschy-Kleinheinz also competed in two Summer Olympics, earning her best finish of sixth in the K-1 500 m event at Barcelona in 1992.

References

External links
 
 

1962 births
Living people
French female canoeists
ICF Canoe Sprint World Championships medalists in kayak
Olympic canoeists of France
Canoeists at the 1992 Summer Olympics
Canoeists at the 1996 Summer Olympics